Suzanne Packer (born Suzanne Jackson on 26 November 1962) is a Welsh actress, known for playing the role of Tess Bateman in the BBC medical drama Casualty from September 2003 to August 2015. She later returned to the series as a guest for the 30th-anniversary episodes. Since departing from Casualty, she has appeared in various television series including Bang, In My Skin and The Pembrokeshire Murders.

Early life
Packer is the daughter of Jamaican immigrant parents to Abergavenny, and her mother worked as a nurse. She is the elder sister of the Olympic hurdler Colin Jackson.

While studying at Llanedeyrn High School in Cardiff, she showed an interest in acting, playing the lead in school plays including Oklahoma and The King and I. Packer attended the National Youth Theatre of Wales before earning a BA in theatre and drama at the University of Warwick. She then trained at the Webber Douglas Academy of Dramatic Art in London. Prior to acting professionally, Packer worked as a drama supply teacher. After working at one particular school for three months, she was offered a permanent contract, which she declined due to wanting to pursue acting full-time.

Career
In 1991, Packer co-founded BiBi Crew, Britain's first comedy theatre troupe made up entirely of Black women. After she gained an audition for the BBC drama Casualty and was cast as Tess Bateman, she began appearing onscreen from September 2003. On 22 August 2015, she announced her decision to leave Casualty after playing the character of Tess for over 11 years.

Packer appeared with her brother Colin on the first series of Pointless Celebrities on 6 July 2011. They were eliminated in the first round. In 2018, she began portraying the role of Nurse Digby in the BBC Three series In My Skin. On 4 November 2018, Packer played Eve Cicero in the Doctor Who episode, "The Tsuranga Conundrum". In 2021, she starred in the ITV miniseries The Pembrokeshire Murders.

Personal life
Packer met American actor Jesse Newman while on a tour in Europe, and the pair later got married, and had a son together, Paris. The pair later got divorced.

Filmography

References

External links
 

1962 births
Living people
Actresses from Cardiff
Alumni of Goldsmiths, University of London
Alumni of the University of Warwick
Alumni of the Webber Douglas Academy of Dramatic Art
Black British actresses
Black British schoolteachers
People from Abergavenny
People of Jamaican Maroon descent
Welsh people of American descent
Welsh people of Jamaican descent
Welsh people of Taíno descent
Welsh schoolteachers
Welsh soap opera actresses
Welsh television actresses